NetCast (later Smart TV, then Legacy Platform) is a proprietary firmware by LG Electronics that was preinstalled on their smart TVs between 2007 and 2014. LG has signed partnerships with various companies to provide services on the TV. It includes YouTube, AccuWeather, Orange Mobile, Maxdome, CinemaNow and Netflix. LG has combined local and global services to provide the most relevant content. In 2011, they added support for widgets, which users were able to download. The widgets made use of Adobe Flash or web technologies. It was succeeded by WebOS.

History 
Netcast was rebranded to Smart TV in 2011, which was shown first at the CES. In 2011, the company Marmalade Technologies added Netcast support to their Marmalade SDK.

TechRadar considered it "just plain disappointing" in a 2010 review. In a 2011 review, they noted that Netcast was first a mere placeholder with only three services, but noted that more apps had been added via a firmware update. 

The OpenLGTV project has added homebrew widgets to the Netcast platform.

The software logged the filenames that were accessed and uploaded them to servers of LG.

Netcast and Smart TV were replaced by the WebOS platform in 2014. Starting in 2015, all smart TVs by LG were based on WebOS.

See also
Orsay (operating system) - the direct competitor of NetCast made by Samsung used in its Internet@TV and Smart TV lines from 2009 to 2014 before being replaced by Tizen in 2015

References

External links 
 NetCast platform specifications

LG Electronics
Smart TV